Count of Altamira is a hereditary title in the Peerage of Spain, accompanied by the dignity of Grandee and granted in 1455 by Henry IV to Lope Sánchez de Ulloa, Lord of the Fortress of Altamira.

The title makes reference to the Fortress of Altamira, near Brión, La Coruña.

Counts of Altamira (1455)

Lope Sánchez de Ulloa y Moscoso, 1st Count of Altamira
Rodrigo de Moscoso y Osorio, 2nd Count of Altamira
Lope de Moscoso Osorio y Andrade, 3rd Count of Altamira
Rodrigo de Moscoso Osorio y Álvarez de Toledo, 4th Count of Altamira
Lope de Moscoso Osorio y Castro, 5th Count of Altamira
Gaspar de Moscoso Osorio y Sandoval, 6th Count of Altamira
Luis Hurtado de Mendoza, 7th Count of Altamira
Antonio Gaspar de Moscoso Osorio y Aragón, 8th Count of Altamira
Ventura Osorio de Moscoso y Guzmán, 9th Count of Altamira
Ventura Osorio de Moscoso y Fernández de Córdoba, 10th Count of Altamira
Vicente Joaquín Osorio de Moscoso y Guzmán, 11th Count of Altamira
Vicente Isabel Osorio de Moscoso y Álvarez de Toledo, 12th Count of Altamira
Vicente Pío Osorio de Moscoso y Ponce de León, 13th Count of Altamira
José María Osorio de Moscoso y Carvajal, 14th Count of Altamira
Francisco de Asís Osorio de Moscoso y de Borbón, 15th Count of Altamira
Francisco de Asís Osorio de Moscoso y Jordán de Urríes, 16th Count of Altamira
Gerardo Osorio de Moscoso y Reynoso, 17th Count of Altamira
Leopoldo Barón y Osorio de Moscoso, 18th Count of Altamira
Gonzalo Barón y Gavito, 19th Count of Altamira

See also
List of current Grandees of Spain

References 

Grandees of Spain
Lists of counts
Lists of Spanish nobility